The Miss District of Columbia  competition is the pageant that selects the representative for the District of Columbia in the Miss America Pageant.

The District of Columbia pageant, which was suspended for some years during the 1960s and 1990s, is unusual in that many winners come from outside the district. Women are eligible to compete for the title if they attend school, work, or are ordinarily a resident in the District, and many students who have won the title come from out-of-state.

Alivia Roberts of Shannon, MS was crowned Miss District of Columbia 2022 on June 19, 2022 at Howard Theater in Washington, D.C. She competed for the title of Miss America 2023 at the Mohegan Sun in Uncasville, Connecticut.

Gallery of past titleholders

Results summary
The following is a visual summary of the past results of Miss District of Columbia titleholders at the national Miss America pageants/competitions. The year in parentheses indicates the year of the national competition during which a placement and/or award was garnered, not the year attached to the contestant's state title.

Placements
 Miss Americas: Margaret Gorman (1921), Venus Ramey (1944)
 1st runners-up: Marjorie Joesting (1926), Margo Lucey (1957), Rosanne Tueller (1964)
 2nd runners-up: Jean Cavanaugh (1941)
 3rd runners-up: Ruth Rea (1961), Marshawn Evans (2002), Briana Kinsey (2018)
 4th runners-up: Dixie Rafter (1943), Shannon Schambeau (2006)
 Top 4: Margaret Gorman (1922)
 Top 10: Linda Weisbrod (1955), Nicole Messina (1999), Kate Grinold (2009), Jennifer Corey (2010), Allison Farris (2019), Andolyn Medina (2022)
 Top 12: Helen Clum (1935)
 Top 13: Dorothy Powell (1945)
 Top 15: Dorothy Parker (1938), Catherine Howe (1940)
 Top 16: Sandra Stahl (1951)
 Top 18: Rita Burns (1933)

Awards

Preliminary awards
 Preliminary Interview: Marshawn Evans (2002)
 Preliminary Lifestyle & Fitness: Dixie Rafter (1943), Venus Ramey (1944), Ruth Rea (1961), Rosanne Tueller (1964), Shannon Schambeau (2006), Cierra Jackson (2017)
 Preliminary Talent: Catherine Howe (1940), Venus Ramey (1944), Sandra Stahl (1951), Iris Fitch (1953), Linda Weisbrod (1955), Virginia Pailes (1960) (tie), Rosanne Tueller (1964), Nicole Messina (1999), Marshawn Evans (2002)

Non-finalist awards
 Non-finalist Interview: Ashley Boalch (2012)
 Non-finalist Talent: Scarlett Shinault (1962), Toyia Taylor (2000), Shayna Rudd (2008)

Other awards
 Jean Bartel Military Awareness Scholarship: Andolyn Medina (2022)
Miss Congeniality: Iris Fitch (1953) (tie)
 Four Points Award: Stephanie Williams (2011)
 Quality of Life Award Finalists: Nicole Messina (1999), Therese Lizardo (2005), Briana Kinsey (2018), Allison Farris (2019)
 STEM Scholarship Award Winners: Briana Kinsey (2018)
Top Fundraiser 4th runner-ups: Andolyn Medina (2022)

Winners 

Notes

References

External links

 Official website

Culture of Washington, D.C.
District of Columbia
Women in Washington, D.C.
Annual events in Washington, D.C.